Cross County Community School is a consolidated school district in Polk County, Nebraska, United States. In 2002, the communities of Benedict and Stromsburg consolidated their school districts to form Cross County Public Schools. The school's team mascot is the Cougar. The current school building was not built till 2009.

Sports and extracurricular activities
Cross County currently offers basketball, track and field, golf, football, robotics, wrestling, weights, theater, band, choir, and speech as the main extracurricular activities for boys and the same for girls, with the exception of football. During football season, girls have the option of golf, volleyball, or softball.

References

External links

School districts in Nebraska
Education in York County, Nebraska
Education in Polk County, Nebraska
School districts established in 2002